The Divine Cage is the second studio album by the Italian progressive power metal band Concept. The Japanese edition (including bonus) was published by the label Soundholic.

Track listing 
 New Perspectives – 3:49
 Faithless Truth – 5:46
 Don't Let Me Die – 4:12
 My Cage – 5:17
 Out of Fashion – 3:19
 A Fate Worse Than Death (of Reason) – 8:33
 Changeover – 4:03
 Catching Dreams (Out of The Cage) – 5:26
 Lost In A Sigh – 4:38
 Under My Care – 4:59
 My Divine Embrace – 5:29
 bonus: Forget Me! (Japan) – 6:05

Personnel 
 Mariano Croce - guitars 
 Andrea Mastroianni - keyboards
 Gianni Carcione - lead vocals
 Andrea Arcangeli - bass
 David Folchitto - drums

References

2005 albums
Concept (band) albums